Apophysis may refer to:
A tubercle (bone)
Apophysis (spider), an outgrowth of the exoskeleton in spiders and other arachnids
In botany, an outgrowth or enlargement of an organ such as a plant stem
Apophysis (software), a fractal flame generating program for Microsoft Windows
Apophysis (geology), a discordant offshoot from another body, such as a sill, dike, or pluton

See also
Apophasis
Apophis (disambiguation)